= OSU Football =

OSU Football may refer to:

- Oklahoma State Cowboys football, the NCAA Division 1 football team of Oklahoma State University (OSU), playing in the Big 12 conference
- Oregon State Beavers football, the NCAA Division 1 football team of Oregon State University (OSU), playing in the Pac-12 conference
- Ohio State Buckeyes football, the NCAA Division 1 football program of the Ohio State University (OSU), playing in the Big Ten conference
